Shangrao is a medium-sized prefecture-level city located in the northeast of Jiangxi province, People's Republic of China. The city borders the province of Anhui to the north, the province of Zhejiang to the east, and the province of Fujian to the south. Also, the city's western reaches extend into Poyang Lake. Shangrao had a population of 6,491,088 as of 2020 census whom 1,293,399 lived in the built up (or metro) area made of Xinzhou and Guangxin districts, Guangfeng District not being conurbated yet. Shangrao itself is at the very western edge of the Wu-speaking areas, while most of its associated counties speak Gan.

Subdivisions 

Shangrao administers three districts, one county-level city, and eight counties. The information here presented uses data from 2010 national census.

Climate

Transportation

Railway
Shangrao Railway Station is served by three major railways passing through Shangrao: the Shanghai–Kunming Railway, the Shanghai–Kunming High-Speed Railway and the Hefei–Fuzhou High-Speed Railway.

Air
Shangrao Sanqingshan Airport opened on 28 May 2017.

Education 
 Shangrao Normal University is located in Shangrao. It was originally named Shangrao Normal Junior College when it was founded in 1958, and changed its name to Gan Dongbei (Northeastern part of Jiangxi) University in 1959. It was closed down during the period of the Chinese Cultural Revolution. Authorized by the State Council, Shangrao Normal Junior College was restored in 1977. Then, with authorization of Ministry of Education and People's Government of Jiangxi Province, it changed its name to Shangrao Normal College in March 2000. Over the past 20 years, more than 26,000 students graduated from Shangrao Normal University, to work in various careers in China.

Sports

The 21,000-capacity Shangrao Stadium is located in the city. It is used mostly for football matches.

See also 
 Mount Sanqing, famed Taoist sacrace mountain located in Shangrao

References

External links

 Other Website:about life in Shangrao (Chinese Version)
 Official Website:Shangrao News (Chinese Version)
 Official Website:Windows of Shangrao (Chinese Version)
 Other Website:about live in Shanrgao (Chinese Version)

 
Cities in Jiangxi
Prefecture-level divisions of Jiangxi